The Central Police Station, also known as the National Military Heritage Museum, is a historic police station located at 701 Messanie in St. Joseph, Missouri.  It was designed by Edmund J. Eckel and built in 1909.  It is a three-story, "L"-plan brick building in the Richardsonian Romanesque style.  It has a hipped roof, limestone ornamentation and details, and a round corner tower.

It was listed on the National Register of Historic Places in 2009.

References

Government buildings on the National Register of Historic Places in Missouri
Richardsonian Romanesque architecture in Missouri
Government buildings completed in 1909
Buildings and structures in St. Joseph, Missouri
National Register of Historic Places in Buchanan County, Missouri